Bur Khani (also Romanized as Būr Khānī) is a village in Lafur Rural District, North Savadkuh County, Mazandaran Province, Iran. At the 2006 census, its population was 322, in 111 families.

References 

Populated places in Savadkuh County